Teresa Cheung may refer to:

Teresa Cheung Siu-wai, Hong Kong socialite, producer and actress
Teresa Cheung Tak-lan, Hong Kong singer